The Catalonia women's national roller hockey team is the national team side of Catalonia at international roller hockey. Nowadays it's not officially recognized by International Roller Sports Federation (FIRS). 

In 2004 was admitted by FIRS, but this decision was revoked in November 2004 (Fresno Case) and again in November 2005, after the Court of Arbitration for Sport forced the FIRS to repeat the vote following the FIRS statute rules. 

In November 2006 was admitted by Confederación Sudamericana del Patín and now plays the CSP Copa America.

Also competes in the Golden Cup, held in Blanes (Catalonia) every year since 2006.

Catalonia squad - 2010 Copa America 

Team Staff
 General Manager:
 Mechanic:

Coaching Staff
 Head Coach: Josep Maria Barberà
 Assistant:

Titles
Golden Cup - 2006, 2007, 2009 (3)

See also
Catalonia national roller hockey team (men's)

References

External links
Website of Catalan Roller Sports Federation

National Roller Hockey Team
Roller Hockey Women
Catalonia Women